The black-and-white tanager (Conothraupis speculigera) is a tanager found in the Tumbes region of southwestern Ecuador and northwestern Peru; it migrates eastwards as far as Acre. The only other member of its genus is the recently rediscovered cone-billed tanager.

It has a total length of 16 cm. (6½ in) and weighs . The male is black with a grey rump, white underparts and a white wing-speculum. It is longer-billed than the superficially similar black-and-white seedeater and lacks the black flanks and chalk-white bill of the related cone-billed tanager. The female is olive with faintly mottled, yellow-tinged underparts. Both sexes have a reddish iris and a greyish bill.

The males' song is distinctive, blackbird-like, loud and ringing.

It is generally uncommon to rare and usually seen singly or in pairs, but may be found in flocks of up to 50 individuals. It eats insects and seeds. In the northern part of its range it breeds during the rainy season (around March), after which it disperses.

The nest was only described in 2006. It is open and rather untidy and loosely woven, some 6–7 cm high and 10–11 cm wide outside, with a nest cup some 6 cm wide and 4 cm deep. It is placed at medium height (about 50–150 cm above ground) in small shrubs. It is built from sticks and leaf petioles, and lined with black rhizomorphs of fungi.

The clutch presumably consists of 2-3 eggs. These are pale blue with heavy, quite evenly distributed brown blotching and measure  21 by 15.6 mm.

Footnotes

References
 Clements, James F.; Shany, Noam; Gardner, Dana & Barnes, Eustace (2001): A Field Guide to the Birds of Peru. Ibis, Temecula, CA. 
 Greeney, Harold F.; Juiña, Mery & Fernando Sornoza, A. (2006): Nest descriptions for Conothraupis speculigera and Thlypopsis ornata in Ecuador. Boletín de la Sociedad Antioqueña de Ornitología 16(1): 24–29. [English with Spanish abstract] PDF fulltext
 Ridgely, Robert S & Greenfield, Paul J. (2001): The Birds of Ecuador. Comstock, Ithaca, NY. 
 Ridgely, Robert S.; Tudor, Guy & Brown, William L. (1989): The Birds of South America Volume 1: The oscine passerines. University of Texas Press, Austin. 

black-and-white tanager
Birds of the Tumbes-Chocó-Magdalena
Birds of Ecuador
Birds of Peru
black-and-white tanager